The Final Solution of the Czech Question was the Nazi German plan for the complete Germanization of the Protectorate of Bohemia and Moravia. German sociologist and anthropologist Karl Valentin Müller asserted that a large part of the Czech nation was racially Aryan and could be Germanized. This was in stark contrast to Germany's Final Solution to the Jewish Question. However, Müller asserted that the Germanization should take place without coercion; instead, he suggested a system of social incentives.

On 27 September 1941 Reinhard Heydrich was appointed Deputy Reich Protector of the Protectorate of Bohemia and Moravia (the part of Czechoslovakia incorporated into the Reich on 15 March 1939) and assumed control. The Reich Protector, Konstantin von Neurath, remained titular head but was sent on "leave" because Hitler, Himmler, and Heydrich felt his "soft approach" to the Czechs had promoted anti-German sentiment and encouraged resistance via strikes and sabotage. On his appointment, Heydrich told his aides: "We will Germanize the Czech vermin."

Heydrich came to Prague to enforce policy, fight resistance to the Nazi regime, and keep up production quotas of Czech motors and arms that were "extremely important to the German war effort". He viewed the area as a bulwark of Germandom and condemned the Czech resistance's "stabs in the back". 

In the furtherance of his goals, Heydrich decreed racial classification of those who could and could not be Germanized. He explained: "Making this Czech garbage into Germans must yield to methods based on racist thought." Racial surveys, conducted under the pretext of tuberculosis prevention, found the Czechs to be more Nordic than the Sudeten Germans, East Prussians, and many Austrians and Bavarians. These results were kept secret. In 1940 Hitler agreed that around half of the Czech population were suitable for Germanization, while the "mongoloid types" and the Czech intelligentsia were not to be Germanized and were to be “deprived of [their] power, eliminated, and shipped out of the country by all sorts of methods.”

Under Generalplan Ost, the Nazis had intended to displace the un-Germanizable population to Siberia. However, due to the war effort's need for labor, this plan was never implemented.

See also 
 Anti-Slavic sentiment
 German occupation of Czechoslovakia
 Kidnapping of children by Nazi Germany
 Protectorate of Bohemia and Moravia
 Sōshi-kaimei

Sources

References 

Anti-Czech sentiment
Czechoslovakia in World War II
National questions
Politics of Nazi Germany
Protectorate of Bohemia and Moravia
Nazi terminology
Ethnic cleansing in Europe
Euphemisms
Germanization